Samuel Caldwell Sample (August 15, 1796 – December 2, 1855) was an American lawyer and politician who served a single term as a United States Representative from Indiana from 1843 to 1845.

Early life
Sample Caldwell Sample was born in Elkton, Maryland, to John Sample. His father was a captain serving under Thomas Veazey in the War of 1812. Sample attended a rural school. He learned to become a carpenter and assisted his father in his contracting business. Around 1823 he moved with his father to Connersville, Indiana. He studied law there and was admitted to the bar in 1833.

Career
After being admitted to the bar, he began practicing law in South Bend, Indiana. In 1834 he was elected prosecuting attorney and subsequently elected judge of the ninth judicial circuit in 1836. He served as judge until he resigned in 1843. He also served as the first president of the First National Bank of South Bend.

Political career
He was elected to the 28th United States Congress as a Whig where he served from 1843 to 1845, the first representative from Indiana's 9th congressional district. He was defeated for reelection in 1844 by Charles W. Cathcart.

Later career
After his defeat from Congress, he returned to South Bend, where he resumed practicing law until his death.

Personal life
Sample married Ann Howard of Elkton.

Sample died on December 2, 1855, at his home in South Bend. He was buried at City Cemetery in South Bend.

References

External links

  
  

1796 births
1855 deaths
People from Elkton, Maryland
Politicians from South Bend, Indiana
Indiana lawyers
Indiana state court judges
Whig Party members of the United States House of Representatives from Indiana
19th-century American politicians
People from Connersville, Indiana
19th-century American judges
19th-century American lawyers